Anthimos Rotos (born 7 May 1977) is a Cypriot sprinter. He competed in the men's 4 × 100 metres relay at the 2000 Summer Olympics.

References

1977 births
Living people
Athletes (track and field) at the 2000 Summer Olympics
Cypriot male sprinters
Olympic athletes of Cyprus
Athletes (track and field) at the 2001 Mediterranean Games
Place of birth missing (living people)
Mediterranean Games competitors for Cyprus